A semantics encoding is a translation between formal languages.  For programmers, the most familiar form of encoding is the compilation of a programming language into machine code or byte-code. Conversion between document formats are also forms of encoding. Compilation of TeX or LaTeX documents to PostScript are also commonly encountered encoding processes. Some high-level preprocessors such as OCaml's Camlp4 also involve encoding of a programming language into another.

Formally, an encoding of a language A into language B is a mapping of all terms of A into B. If there is a satisfactory encoding of A into B, B is considered at least as powerful (or at least as expressive) as A.

Properties 

An informal notion of translation is not sufficient to help determine expressivity of languages, as it permits trivial encodings such as mapping all elements of A to the same element of B. Therefore, it is necessary to determine the definition of a "good enough" encoding. This notion varies with the application. 

Commonly, an encoding  is expected to preserve a number of properties.

Preservation of compositions 

 soundness  For every n-ary operator  of A, there exists an n-ary operator  of B such that

 completeness  For every n-ary operator  of A, there exists an n-ary operator  of B such that

(Note: as far as the author is aware of, this criterion of completeness is never used.)

Preservation of compositions is useful insofar as it guarantees that components can be examined either separately or together without "breaking" any interesting property. In particular, in the case of compilations, this soundness guarantees the possibility of proceeding with separate compilation of components, while completeness guarantees the possibility of de-compilation.

Preservation of reductions 

This assumes the existence of a notion of reduction on both language A and language B. Typically, in the case of a programming language, reduction is the relation which models the execution of a program.

 soundness  For every terms  of language A, if  then .
 completeness  For every term  of language A and every terms  of language B, if  then there exists some  such that .

This preservation guarantees that both languages behave the same way. Soundness guarantees that all possible behaviours are preserved while completeness guarantees that no behaviour is added by the encoding. In particular, in the case of compilation of a programming language, soundness and completeness together mean that the compiled program behaves accordingly to the high-level semantics of the programming language.

Preservation of termination 

This also assumes the existence of a notion of reduction on both language A and language B.

 soundness  for any term , if all reductions of  converge, then all reductions of  converge.
 completeness  for any term , if all reductions of  converge, then all reductions of  converge.

In the case of compilation of a programming language, soundness guarantees that the compilation does not introduce non-termination such as endless loops or endless recursions. The completeness property is useful when language B is used to study or test a program written in language A, possibly by extracting key parts of the code: if this study or test proves that the program terminates in B, then it also terminates in A.

Preservation of observations 

This assumes the existence of a notion of observation on both language A and language B. In programming languages, typical observables are results of inputs and outputs, by opposition to pure computation. In a description language such as HTML, a typical observable is the result of page rendering.

 soundness  for every observable  on terms of A, there exists an observable  of terms of B such that for any term  with observable ,  has observable .
 completeness  for every observable  on terms of A, there exists an observable  on terms of B such that for any term  with observable ,  has observable .

Preservation of simulations 

This assumes the existence of notion of simulation on both language A and language B. In a programming languages, a program simulates another if it can perform all the same (observable) tasks and possibly some others. Simulations are used typically to describe compile-time optimizations.

 soundness  for every terms , if  simulates  then  simulates .
 completeness  for every terms , if  simulates  then  simulates .

Preservation of simulations is a much stronger property than preservation of observations, which it entails. In turn, it is weaker than a property of preservation of bisimulations. As in previous cases, soundness is important for compilation, while completeness is useful for testing or proving properties.

Preservation of equivalences 

This assumes the existence of a notion of equivalence on both language A and language B. Typically, this can be a notion of equality of structured data or a notion of syntactically different yet semantically identical programs, such as structural congruence or structural equivalence. 

Preservation of distribution  
This assumes the existence of a notion of distribution on both language A and language B. Typically, for compilation of distributed programs written in Acute, JoCaml or E, this means distribution of processes and data among several computers or CPUs.

 soundness  if a term  is the composition of two agents  then  must be the composition of two agents .

See also 
 Bisimulation
 Compiler 
 Semantics
 Semantic dictionary encoding (SDE)

External links
 The Program Transformation Wiki
Formal languages